The Lobachevsky Prize, awarded by the Russian Academy of Sciences, and the Lobachevsky Medal,  awarded by the Kazan State University, are mathematical awards in honor of Nikolai Ivanovich Lobachevsky.

History
The Lobachevsky Prize was established in 1896 by the Kazan Physical and Mathematical Society, in honor of Russian mathematician Nikolai Ivanovich Lobachevsky, who had been a professor at  Kazan University, where he spent nearly his entire mathematical career. The prize was first awarded in 1897. 
Between the October revolution of 1917 and World War II the Lobachevsky Prize was awarded only twice, by the Kazan State University, in 1927 and 1937.
In 1947, by a decree of the Council of Ministers of the USSR, the jurisdiction over awarding the Lobachevsky Prize was transferred to the USSR Academy of Sciences. The 1947 decree specified that there be two prizes, awarded every five years: the main, international, Lobachevsky Prize, for which both Soviet and foreign scientists would be eligible, and an honorable mention prize, for Soviet mathematicians only.
In a 2003 article, B. N. Shapukov, a professor at the Kazan State University, writes that the 1947 decree also specified that awarding of the prize by the USSR Academy of Sciences should be done in consultation with the Kazan State University, but this condition was not subsequently followed in practice.

Another decree of the  Council of Ministers of the USSR, in 1956,  specified that there be only one, international, Lobachevsky Prize, to be awarded every three years.

With the dissolution of the Soviet Union at the end of 1991, the Russian Academy of Sciences became the legatee of the USSR Academy of Sciences. The Russian Academy of Sciences continued awarding the Lobachevsky Prize, awarding it in 1992, 1996 and 2000. As of January 2010, the Lobachevsky Prize is listed among its awards at the Russian Academy of Sciences website.

In 1990-1991, while preparing the 1992 celebration of Lobachevsky's 200th anniversary, the Kazan State University organizers of this celebration lobbied the Soviet government to establish a special Kazan State University award in honor of Lobachevsky. A June 1991 decree of the Cabinet of Ministers of the USSR established the Lobachevsky Medal, for outstanding contributions to geometry, to be awarded by the Kazan State University. The Lobachevsky Medal was awarded by the university in 1992, 1997 and 2002. The article of Shapukov mentions that during the 1997 competition for the Lobachevsky Medal, the Mathematics section of the Russian Academy of Sciences complained about the fact and the process of awarding the Medal.
The Kazan State University website for the Lobachevsky Medal contains a list of recipients of the Lobachesky Prize from 1897 to 1989, which excludes the 1992, 1996 and 2000 Russian Academy of Sciences awards.  The Russian Academy of Sciences website for the Lobachevsky Prize contains a list of recipients of the prize from 1897 to 2000 and does not mention Kazan State University's Lobachevsky Medal.

Lobachevsky Prize winners

Kazan Physical and Mathematical Society/Kazan University 
 Sophus Lie, 1897
 Wilhelm Killing, 1900
 David Hilbert, 1903
 Ludwig Schlesinger, 1909 (awarded in 1912)
 Friedrich Schur, 1912
 Hermann Weyl, 1927
 Élie Cartan, 1937 (main, international, prize)
 Viktor V. Wagner, 1937 (special prize for young Soviet mathematicians)

In 1906, Beppo Levi received an honorable mention. The prize itself was not awarded.

Soviet Academy of Sciences 
 Nikolai Efimov, 1951
 Aleksandr D. Alexandrov, 1951
 Aleksei Pogorelov, 1959
 Lev Pontryagin, 1966
 Heinz Hopf, 1969
 Pavel Alexandrov, 1972
 Boris Delaunay, 1977
 Sergei Novikov, 1980
 Herbert Busemann, 1983
 Andrey Kolmogorov, 1986
 Friedrich Hirzebruch, 1989

Russian Academy of Sciences
 Vladimir Arnold, 1992
 Grigory Margulis, 1996
 Yurii Reshetnyak, 2000

Lobachevsky Medal winners

Kazan State University 
 Aleksandr P. Norden, 1992
 Boris P. Komrakov, 1997
 Mikhail Gromov, 1997
 Shiing-Shen Chern, 2002
 Richard Schoen, 2017
 Daniel Wise, 2019
 Idzhad  Sabitov, 2021

In 1997, Valery N. Berestovsky (Russia), Idjad Kh. Sabitov (Russia) and Boris Rosenfeld (USA) received an honorable mention.

See also

 List of mathematics awards

Notes

References 
V. V. Vishnevsky,  (in Russian), The 200th anniversary of N. I. Lobachevsky, its outcomes and lessons. Tr. Geom. Semin., 23, Kazan Mathematical Society, Kazan, 1997, 23-32

Mathematics awards
Awards established in 1896
Awards of the Russian Academy of Sciences